Henrik Steenbuch (20 November 1774 – 11 October 1839) was a Norwegian lawyer and publicist.

References

1774 births
1839 deaths
19th-century Norwegian lawyers